Dragan Gajić (born 21 July 1984) is a Slovenian handball player who plays for Limoges Hand 87.

Individual awards 
 EHF Cup Top Scorer: 2014 (72 goals)
 World Men's Handball Championship Top Scorer: 2015 (71 goals)
 World Men's Handball Championship All Star Team: 2015

References

External links

Profile at Montpellier HB official website

1984 births
Living people
Sportspeople from Celje
Slovenian male handball players
Expatriate handball players
Slovenian expatriate sportspeople in Croatia
Slovenian expatriate sportspeople in France
Slovenian expatriate sportspeople in Hungary
Montpellier Handball players
Veszprém KC players
Slovenian people of Serbian descent